Martin Wolf is an American investment banker who is currently head of Martin Wolf M&A advisors, a global M&A Advisory firm. Wolf grew up in Flint Township, not to be confused with Flint, Michigan. Then Wolf attended Michigan State University but ultimately graduated from the University of Michigan.

American investment bankers
Ross School of Business alumni
Living people
Year of birth missing (living people)